Bertram Simpson may refer to:

Bertram Simpson (bishop) (1883–1971),  Anglican cleric
Bertram Lenox Simpson (1877–1930), British author